Quitman County is a county located in the U.S. state of Mississippi. As of the 2020 census, the population was 6,176, making it the third-least populous county in Mississippi. Its county seat is Marks. The county is named after John A. Quitman, Governor of Mississippi from 1835 to 1836 and from 1850 to 1851.

Quitman County is located in the Mississippi Delta region of Mississippi.

History
The county was developed for cotton cultivation. Much of the bottomlands behind the riverfront were not developed until the late 19th century, and population continued to increase as the frontier was cleared and cultivated. The county reached its peak population in 1940. Agricultural mechanization reduced the need for farm labor, and workers were recruited to northern and midwestern industrial cities. Thousands of African Americans left in the Great Migration, many going upriver to St. Louis and Chicago.

Poor People's Campaign

Martin Luther King Jr. originally wanted the Poor People's Campaign to start in Quitman County because of the intense and visible economic disparity there. On March 18, 1968, King visited the town of Marks, Mississippi.  He watched a teacher feeding black schoolchildren their lunch, consisting only of a slice of apple and some crackers, and was moved to tears.

After King's death, the Southern part of the Campaign began in Quitman County. Participants rode a train of mules to Washington, D.C. to protest about economic conditions. According to wagonmaster Willie Bolden, white citizens of Marks harassed the mule train on its way out of town.  Bolden stated that they "would drive by blowing their horns, purposely trying to spook the mules and us." More recently, Quitman County residents have made an effort to promote tourism based on the county's role in the Poor People's Campaign.

Geography
It is the fourth-smallest county in Mississippi by land area and third-smallest by total area.

Major highways
  Mississippi Highway 3
  Mississippi Highway 6
  U.S. Route 278

Adjacent counties
 Tunica County (north)
 Panola County (east)
 Tallahatchie County (south)
 Coahoma County (west)

National protected area
 Coldwater River National Wildlife Refuge (part)

Demographics
Reflecting the decreased need for farm labor after mechanization and the development of industrial farms, the population has declined by more than two thirds since its peak in 1940.

2020 census

As of the 2020 United States census, there were 6,176 people, 3,027 households, and 1,833 families residing in the county.

2010 census
As of the 2010 United States Census, there were 8,223 people living in the county. 69.6% were Black or African American, 29.0% White, 0.2% Native American, 0.1% Asian, 0.3% of some other race and 0.8% of two or more races. 0.7% were Hispanic or Latino (of any race).

2000 census
As of the census of 2000, there were 10,117 people, 3,565 households, and 2,506 families living in the county.  The population density was 25 people per square mile (10/km2).  There were 3,923 housing units at an average density of 10 per square mile (4/km2).  The racial makeup of the county was 68.62% Black or African American, 30.47% White, 0.13% Native American, 0.17% Asian, 0.01% Pacific Islander, 0.08% from other races, and 0.52% from two or more races.  0.54% of the population were Hispanic or Latino of any race.

In 2000, there were 3,565 households, out of which 34.40% had children under the age of 18 living with them, 37.60% were married couples living together, 26.80% had a female householder with no husband present, and 29.70% were non-families. 26.90% of all households were made up of individuals, and 12.30% had someone living alone who was 65 years of age or older.  The average household size was 2.80 and the average family size was 3.42.

In the county, the population was spread out, with 32.00% under the age of 18, 9.60% from 18 to 24, 25.70% from 25 to 44, 19.50% from 45 to 64, and 13.20% who were 65 years of age or older.  The median age was 32 years. For every 100 females there were 86.50 males.  For every 100 females age 18 and over, there were 79.30 males.

The median income for a household in the county was $20,636, and the median income for a family was $25,394. Males had a median income of $23,571 versus $16,993 for females. The per capita income for the county was $10,817.  About 28.60% of families and 33.10% of the population were below the poverty line, including 43.10% of those under age 18 and 30.60% of those age 65 or over.

Quitman County has the fifth-lowest per capita income in Mississippi and the 51st lowest in the United States.

Government and infrastructure
The Mississippi Department of Corrections (MDOC) operates the Quitman County Community Work Center (CWC) in an area near Lambert. In addition MDOC operates the Mississippi State Penitentiary (Parchman) in an unincorporated area in Sunflower County, in the area. Camp B, an inmate housing unit, was a satellite complex located away from the main Parchman prison property in unincorporated Quitman County, near Lambert. Camp B was one of Parchman's largest African-American housing units. Camp B's buildings have been demolished.  The Mississippi Code (§ 47-5-131) gives Quitman County the right to "not over twenty (20) offenders from the Parchman facility for five (5) workdays of each week for the purpose of working the roads of Quitman County", and goes on to state that the "board of supervisors of Quitman County shall lay out and designate roads to be worked by the offenders, and the board of supervisors shall furnish transportation to and from the Parchman facility for offenders."

Education
On July 24, 1969, federal judge William Keady found that Quitman County school officials were maintaining an unconstitutional de jure racially segregated school system, and he placed the school board under the supervision of United States District Court for the Northern District of Mississippi.  As of 1993, this order had not been set aside.  In March 1991, the school board asked the district court for permission to close Crowder elementary and junior high school, a majority-white school. The court gave permission, and a group of parents sued for an injunction to prevent the closing.  The district court denied them an injunction, and this decision was affirmed by the United States Court of Appeals for the Fifth Circuit.

By 1975, the majority of African-American students in Quitman County were attending public schools, which had earlier been segregated. But the majority of white students had been moved into newly established private academies. This situation has continued; in 2007 the Mississippi Department of Education found that the students in the district were 97.92% African American, 1.81% White, and 0.27% Hispanic.

Schools in Quitman County remain effectively segregated by race. White students almost exclusively attend private schools while Black children attend the local public schools.

 Public School Districts
 Quitman County School District - The only school district in the county.
 Private Schools
 Delta Academy (Marks)

Communities

City
 Marks (county seat)

Towns
 Crenshaw (mostly in Panola County)
 Crowder (partly in Panola County)
 Falcon
 Lambert
 Sledge

Census-designated place
 Darling

Other unincorporated communities

 Allen
 Barksdale
 Belen
 Birdie
 Bobo
 Chancy
 Denton
 Essex
 Hinchcliff
 Locke Station (partly in Panola County)
 Longstreet
 Oliverfried
 Riverview
 Sabino
 Vance (partly in Tallahatchie County)
 Walnut
 West Marks
 Yarbrough

Notable people
 Earl Hooker (January 15, 1929 — April 21, 1970) — blues guitarist.
 Charley Pride (March 18, 1934 —December 12,2020) — country music artist.
 Snooky Pryor (September 15, 1921 — October 18, 2006) — harmonica player.
 Sunnyland Slim (September 5, 1907 — March 17, 1995 ) — blues piano player.
 Fred Smith (August 11, 1944-) Founder, President and CEO FedEx

See also

 National Register of Historic Places listings in Quitman County, Mississippi

References

 
Mississippi counties
1877 establishments in Mississippi
Populated places established in 1877
Black Belt (U.S. region)
Majority-minority counties in Mississippi